Reedy Fork is a  long 3rd order tributary to the Haw River, in Alamance County, North Carolina.

Variant names
According to the Geographic Names Information System, it has also been known historically as:  
Reedy Fork Creek

Course
Reedy Fork rises in Forsyth County on the divide between Reedy Fork and Kerners Mill Creek.  Reedy Fork then flows east into and through Guilford County to meet the Haw River in Alamance County about 0.5 miles east of Ossipee.

Tributaries

Watershed
Reedy Fork drains  of area, receives about 45.5 in/year of precipitation, and has a wetness index of 429.86 and is about 31% forested.

See also
List of rivers of North Carolina

References

Rivers of North Carolina
Rivers of Alamance County, North Carolina
Rivers of Forsyth County, North Carolina
Rivers of Guilford County, North Carolina